Panikos Iakovou (31 March 1941 – 25 April 2010) was a Cypriot footballer. He played in eleven matches for the Cyprus national football team from 1965 to 1968.

References

External links
 

1941 births
2010 deaths
Cypriot footballers
Cyprus international footballers
Place of birth missing
Association footballers not categorized by position
EPA Larnaca FC managers
Cyprus U21 national football team managers
Cyprus U19 national football team managers